Unit 999 (Arabic: الوحدة 999 قتال), also known as Task Force 999, is an Egyptian military special operations and reconnaissance unit.

See also
 Unit 777
 Unit 333

References

Special forces of Egypt